Togia Likalika Sioneholo is a Niuean politician who was a cabinet minister of Toke Talagi's government from June 2008 to May 2011 after being elected to the Niue Assembly in the June 2008 general election. He was minister for community affairs, education, justice, shipping and bulk fuels. He was formerly chief electoral officer.

Early life 
Sioneholo is from the village of Mutalau, but now resides in the village of Alofi South. He first graduated from the University of the South Pacific with a bachelor's of arts in history and politics.  

He is also a qualified lawyer graduated from the University of Tasmania and did post-graduated studies at the Australian National University.  

Previously, Togia was head of the Niue justice department.  He is also the secretary and treasurer of the Ekalesia Niue church in Mutalau.

References

Living people
Members of the Niue Assembly
University of the South Pacific alumni
University of Tasmania alumni
Australian National University alumni
Niuean lawyers
Niuean Congregationalists
Niuean religious leaders
Year of birth missing (living people)
Justice ministers of Niue
Trade ministers of Niue
Ministers of Education of Niue